Yang Jung-Mo (Hangul: 양정모, Hanja: 梁正模; born January 22, 1953, in Busan) is a retired South Korean Olympic freestyle wrestler and the first Olympic champion from South Korea. He received a gold medal in the featherweight division of wrestling at the 1976 Summer Olympics in Montreal.

References

External links
 
 

1953 births
Living people
South Korean wrestlers
Olympic wrestlers of South Korea
Wrestlers at the 1976 Summer Olympics
South Korean male sport wrestlers
Olympic gold medalists for South Korea
Olympic medalists in wrestling
Asian Games medalists in wrestling
Wrestlers at the 1974 Asian Games
Wrestlers at the 1978 Asian Games
World Wrestling Championships medalists
Medalists at the 1976 Summer Olympics
Asian Games gold medalists for South Korea
Medalists at the 1974 Asian Games
Medalists at the 1978 Asian Games
Sportspeople from Busan
20th-century South Korean people
21st-century South Korean people